Chrysoesthia drurella is a moth from the family Gelechiidae. In is found in most of Europe, Russia and North America.

The wingspan is 7–9 mm.

The host plants are Chenopodium and Atriplex species. Chrysoesthia drurella can mainly be found in agricultural areas. The moth has two generations in one year. The first in May and June and the second in August and September.

References

Moths described in 1775
Chrysoesthia
Moths of Japan
Moths of Europe
Moths of New Zealand
Moths of Asia
Taxa named by Johan Christian Fabricius